The 1976 Arizona State Sun Devils football team was an American football team that represented Arizona State University in the Western Athletic Conference (WAC) during the 1976 NCAA Division I football season. In their 19th season under head coach Frank Kush, the Sun Devils compiled a 4–7 record (4–3 against WAC opponents), finished in third place in the WAC, and were outscored by their opponents by a combined total of 241 to 223.

The team's statistical leaders included Dennis Sproul with 1,751 passing yards, Freddie Williams with 516 rushing yards, and Larry Mucker with 835 receiving yards.

Schedule

Personnel

References

	

Arizona State	
Arizona State Sun Devils football seasons					
Arizona State Sun Devils football